992 Swasey is an asteroid, a minor planet orbiting the Sun. It was discovered by Otto Struve in 1922 at the Yerkes Observatory in Williams Bay, Wisconsin, United States. It is named after Ambrose Swasey of the Warner & Swasey Company, which built the 82-inch telescope named after Struve at McDonald Observatory.

References

External links 
 
 

000992
Discoveries by Otto Struve
Named minor planets
992 Swasey
19221114